Rachel Zolf (born 1968) is a Canadian-American poet and theorist. They are the author of five poetry collections: Janey's Arcadia(2014), which was nominated for a Lambda Literary Award, a Raymond Souster Memorial Award, and a Vine Award; Neighbour Procedure(2010); Human Resources(2007), which won the 2008 Trillium Book Award for Poetry and was a finalist for the Lambda Literary Award; Masque (2004), which was shortlisted for the 2005 Trillium Book Award for Poetry; and Her absence, this wanderer (1999), the title poem of which was a finalist in the CBC Literary Competition. A selected poetry, Social Poesis: The Poetry of Rachel Zolf, was published in 2019, and a work of poetics/theory, No One's Witness: A Monstrous Poetics, in 2021. They received a Pew Fellowship in the Arts in 2018.

Zolf's art video translation of three poems from Janey’s Arcadia  has shown at the International Film Festival Rotterdam, the Vancouver Art Gallery, the Dunlop Art Gallery and other venues. Among their many collaborations, Zolf wrote the film The Light Club of Vizcaya: A Women’s Picture, directed by New York artist Josiah McElheny, which premiered at Art Basel Miami  and showed at the Wexner Center for the Arts, the Arts Club of Chicago and elsewhere. They also conducted the first collaborative MFA in Creative Writing ever, The Tolerance Project.

Zolf teaches at the University of Pennsylvania. They were the founding poetry editor for The Walrus magazine and have edited several books of poetry. Their archives are held at York University in Toronto, Ontario, and at Simon Fraser University's Special Collections in Burnaby, British Columbia.

Brian Teare's review of Human Resources in the Winter 2008 Lambda Book Report situates Zolf as "one of an extremely talented generation of Canadian lesbian/queer writers whose innovative cross-genre work comes to us after that of radical foremothers Nicole Brossard, Gail Scott and Erín Moure."

They are the child of author and broadcaster Larry Zolf.

Works
1999: Her Absence, this Wanderer. Ottawa: BuschekBooks.
2004: Masque. Toronto: The Mercury Press.
2007: Human Resources. Toronto: Coach House Books.
2008: Shoot & Weep. Vancouver: Nomados.
2010: Neighbour Procedure. Toronto: Coach House Books.
2014: Janey's Arcadia. Toronto: Coach House Books.
2019: Social Poesis: The Poetry of Rachel Zolf: Wilfrid Laurier University Press.
2021: No One's Witness: A Monstrous Poetics: Duke University Press.

See also

References

External links
 Rachel Zolf’s website
Rachel Zolf first set of archives are held at the Clara Thomas Archives and Special Collections, York University Libraries, Toronto, Ontario.
Rachel Zolf's second set of archives are held at Simon Fraser University's Special Collections in Burnaby, British Columbia.
 Rachel Zolf’s PennSound page
 Rachel Zolf's EPC Page
 Writings in Jacket2 magazine
Interview with Divya Victor in Jacket2 magazine
 Interview with Brian Teare in Jacket2 magazine
 Interview with Joel Bettridge in Jacket magazine
 An interview with Rachel Zolf in "Affect and Audience in the Digital Age"
Chapter on Zolf's work appears in Translingual Poetics: Writing Personhood Under Settler Colonialism by Sarah Dowling
Two chapters on Zolf's work appear in Poetry Matters: Neoliberalism, Affect, and the Posthuman in Twenty-First Century North American Feminist Poetics by Heather Milne
Chapter on Zolf's work by Bob Perelman appears in The Fate of Difficulty in the Poetry of Our Time 

1968 births
Living people
20th-century Canadian poets
21st-century Canadian poets
Canadian lesbian writers
Jewish Canadian writers
Literary editors
LGBT Jews
Canadian LGBT poets
Canadian non-binary writers
Non-binary artists
21st-century American poets
21st-century American writers
21st-century Canadian LGBT people
20th-century Canadian LGBT people